Smilax ornata is a perennial trailing vine with prickly stems that is native to Mexico and Central America. Common names include sarsaparilla, Honduran sarsaparilla, and Jamaican sarsaparilla. 

Uses

Food
Smilax ornata is used as the basis for a soft drink frequently called sarsaparilla. It is also a primary ingredient in old fashioned-style root beer, in conjunction with sassafras, which was more widely available prior to studies of its potential health risks.

Traditional medicine
Smilax ornata was considered by Native Americans to have medicinal properties, and was a popular European treatment for syphilis when it was introduced from the New World. From 1820 to 1910, it was registered in the U.S. Pharmacopoeia as a treatment for syphilis.

Chemical constituents Gallery

See also
 Hemidesmus indicus, Indian sarsaparilla
 Aralia nudicaulis, wild sarsaparilla or false sarsaparilla
 Sweet sarsaparilla (Smilax glyciphylla), a vine native to eastern Australia

References

External links

Whatever happened to the soft drink sarsaparilla? Cecil Adams, 1977

Smilacaceae
Plants described in 1865
Medicinal plants
Spices
Soft beers and malt drinks
Flora of Central America
Flora of Mexico